The House at 105 President's Lane in Quincy, Massachusetts, is the best-preserved and least-altered house of its style in the city.  It is a two-story hip-roofed Colonial Revival house, with a balustrade on the roof, pedimented gable dormers, and an elliptical fanlight in the central bay window on the second floor.  It was built about 1915 by Morton Swallow, about whom nothing is known.  The President's Hill area originally belonged to the Adams political family.

The house was listed on the National Register of Historic Places in 1989.

See also
National Register of Historic Places listings in Quincy, Massachusetts

References

Colonial Revival architecture in Massachusetts
Houses completed in 1915
Houses in Quincy, Massachusetts
National Register of Historic Places in Quincy, Massachusetts
Houses on the National Register of Historic Places in Norfolk County, Massachusetts